The Leazes Park Synagogue is a former synagogue in Leazes Park Road, Newcastle upon Tyne, England.

The building was designed in 1880 by Scottish architect John Johnstone, who was also responsible for Newcastle's old town hall. It is a grade II listed building, whose elaborate two-storey sandstone frontage was designed in the North Italian style.

The Newcastle Old Hebrew Congregation traces its roots back to 1838 and the founding of Temple Street Synagogue, which merged with the Charlotte Square Synagogue to form the Newcastle United Hebrew Congregation. The amalgamated congregation moved into the new synagogue on Leazes Park Road, which was consecrated on 25 August 1880. There were further mergers in 1924 and 1973, but the Leazes Park Synagogue continued to serve as one of the synagogues of the united congregation until its final closure service on 3 May 1978. The Culzean Park Synagogue in Gosforth is now Newcastle's only active Orthodox synagogue.

The synagogue was extended in the 1920s. The synagogue had a basement schoolroom and a Jewish Sports club was formed there in 1934.

The Leazes Park Synagogue building was put to use as a shopping arcade until a fire destroyed the interior in 1989. Restoration was completed by 1996 and it is now used for student accommodation.

See also
History of the Jews in North East England
Newcastle Reform Synagogue
Jesmond Synagogue

References

Former synagogues in England
Religion in Tyne and Wear
Buildings and structures in Newcastle upon Tyne
Grade II listed buildings in Tyne and Wear
Grade II listed religious buildings and structures